The Lewis and Clark class of dry cargo ship is a class of 14 underway replenishment vessels operated by the United States Navy's Military Sealift Command. The ships in the class are named after famous American explorers and pioneers.

Development

Lewis and Clark-class ships replaced the existing eighteen Mars- and Sirius-class combat store ships and the s. When operating in concert with a  the Lewis and Clarks have replaced the s.
The first of the fourteen ships, was placed in service with the Military Sealift Command (MSC) in June 2006. The ships were built to commercial rather than military standards. This was done to minimize costs and to demonstrate the ability to competitively build ships on the civilian market. Though the ships are built to commercial standards they are equipped with various features to increase survivability in a hostile environment, including degaussing, shock hardening in certain equipment, emergency power and communication systems, and increased damage control capability in areas such as firefighting and stability. The ships are equipped with passive defenses to protect against mines and torpedoes and have ABC (atomic, biological, and chemical) countermeasures; the ships also have space and weight reservations for additional self-defense armament. The ships in the class are named after famous American explorers and pioneers.
NASSCO was awarded a detailed design and construction contract in October 2001. The fourteenth ship of the class was delivered on 24 October 2012. As the class entered serial production, NASSCO has increased learning and production efficiencies to make substantial reductions in labor hours, from hull to hull. For example, T-AKE-7 was produced with fewer than 50 percent of the worker-hours it took to produce T-AKE-1, and had a 37 percent reduction in total construction time.

Mission
As part of Military Sealift Command’s (MSC) Naval Fleet Auxiliary Force (NFAF), the ship's mission is to deliver ammunition, provisions, stores, spare parts, potable water and petroleum products to carrier battle groups and other naval forces, serving as a shuttle ship or station ship. T-AKE-1 and -2 were assigned to one of the two active Maritime Prepositioning Ship squadrons, which are permanently forward deployed to the Western Pacific Ocean and Indian Ocean. While identical in configuration to T-AKE-3 to -14, their mission is to provide selective offload of cargo for resupply and sustainment of U.S. Marine Corps forces ashore.
In their primary mission role, the T-AKEs provide logistic lift to deliver cargo (ammunition, food, limited quantities of fuel, repair parts and ship store items) to U.S. and allied ships at sea. In their secondary mission, the T-AKEs may be required to operate in concert with a Henry J. Kaiser-class (T-AO 187) fleet replenishment oiler as a substitute station ship to provide direct logistics support to the ships within a carrier strike group.

History 
On 8 February 2008, dry cargo/ammunition ship USNS Lewis and Clark, the first ship in Military Sealift Command's newest class of ships, returned to Naval Station Norfolk, Virginia, after its first deployment.

The ship successfully completed a six-month tour to the U.S. Central Command area of operations to resupply U.S. Navy ships, providing logistics support in the Persian Gulf, around the Horn of Africa, along the length of Somalia and beyond the equator.

USNS Sacagawea (T-AKE-2) got underway for its first deployment 11 December 2008 in the U.S. Navy's 5th Fleet area of operations.

USNS Richard E. Byrd (T-AKE-4) entered the U.S. Navy's 7th Fleet area of operations 24 July 2008, marking the arrival of the first Lewis and Clark-class combat logistics support ship in service to the  region.

Ships

References 

This article includes information collected from the Naval Sea Systems Command (NAVSEA) Web site navsea.mil and that of the contractor NASSCO.
Press Release

External links

Military Sealift Command
NASSCO/General Dynamics Corporation
Military Sealift Command Fact Sheet, Dry Cargo/Ammunition Ships - T-AKE
US Navy on the T-AKE As It Beefs Up Supply Ship Capacity (updated) at Defense Industry Daily
Team Ships

 

Auxiliary ship classes of the United States Navy
 Lewis and Clark class dry cargo ship
 Lewis and Clark class dry cargo ship
Auxiliary replenishment ship classes